Clematis heracleifolia, the tube clematis (大叶铁线莲 da ye tie xian lian), is a species of flowering plant in the buttercup family Ranunculaceae, native to central and northern China. Unlike most other members of the genus Clematis, it has a scrambling rather than a climbing habit. 

Mature blooms recurve (bend backwards) into a trumpet shape. Repeat flowering sometimes occurs in autumn. 

The Latin specific epithet heracleifolia means "with leaves resembling hogweed" (Heracleum). 

The cultivar 'Cassandra', with fragrant flowers, has won the Royal Horticultural Society's Award of Garden Merit.

References 
 

heracleifolia
Flora of China